Nachiyar Tirumoli is  a set of 143 verses composed by Andal, one of the twelve Alvars in Vaishnava tradition. In her restlessness and eagerness to attain Kannan (Krishna), Andal attempts various methods by which she can attain union with him, which forms the major part of work. Among the Tirumolis, Varanam Aayiram is very well-known and has a special significance. It details Andal's narration of her dream of her experiences with her friends on her way to achieve her purpose of birth (to marry Kannapiran).

These 143 verses are a part of the 4000 divine hymns of Naalayira Divya Prabandham. The verses are classified into fourteen decads, namely, a prayer to Kama, not to destroy a sand castle, Vastapraharana, securing union with the Lord, requesting a cuckoo to call her Lord, Kothai's marriage, eulogising Vishnu's conch, Megha Sandesa, prangs of separation from the Lord, seeking help to attain the Lord, and in praise of Ranganatha.

Etymology
Tirumoli literally means "sacred verses" in a Tamil poetic style and nachiyar means "woman", sometimes also translated as goddess. Therefore, the title means "Sacred Verses of the Woman". This poem fully reveals Andal's intense longing for Vishnu, her divine beloved. Utilising classical Tamil poetic conventions and interspersing stories from the Vedas and the Puranas, Andal creates imagery that is possibly unparalleled in the whole gamut of Indian religious literature.

Organisation of the verses

These 143 pasurams (verses) are organized in 14 segments and each one is called "Tirumoli". Thus the first set of ten pasurams is called as first Tirumoli. And is named after the first phrase of the first pasuram 'tai oru tingalum' (Tamil : தையொரு திங்கள்) .Similarly, all the other Tirumolis are named after the first phrase of first pasuram. And each Tirumoli deals with one specific topic. The first decad is a set of verses to pray Kama to seek Krishna as her husband. Andal expresses that she will lose her life if she is married to someone else other than Krishna. The second decad is a compilation of Andal's prayer to preserver the sand castle she built on the river. The third decad is a set similar to the vastraprahana, the playful chapter in Krishna's life when he took away garments of Gopikas and their request to get them back. The fourth decad has poems where she expresses her union with Lord. Kuyil Pattu or cuckoo's song forms the fifth decad where Andal requests cuckoo to sing in praise of Krishna. Experts attribute the verses to Pancharartra Agama, a mode of worship practiced in Vaishnavite temples. The sixth decad indicates her dream to marry Lord laying down the principles of spiritual dynamics. The eighth Tirumoli called "Vinnila Melappu" deals with Kodai telling her plight to the clouds and sending them as her messenger to Govindan, who is stationed in Thirumalai. The remaining Tirumolis are dedicated to different efforts by Andal to somehow speed up her union with Perumal. In the process, she waits impatiently, and finally in Patti Meindor Karerur Tirumoli, she is reunited with Vishnu.

Critical analysis
Some of Andal's verses express love for Vishnu, written with bold sensuality and startlingly savage longing, hunger and inquiry, that even today many of her most erotic poems are rarely rendered publicly. In one such verse Andal dispenses with metaphor and imagines that she herself in lying in the arms of Krishna, and making love to him:

"My life will be spared / Only if he will come / To stay for me for one night / If he will enter me, / So as to leave / the imprint of his saffron paste / upon my breasts / Mixing, churning, maddening me inside, / Gathering my swollen ripeness / Spilling nectar, / As my body and blood / Bursts into flower."

tell him I will survive
only if he will stay with me
for one day - 
enter me
so as to wipe away
the saffron paste
adorning my breasts(p. 140)

Andal whilst admiring herself wearing the garland which was meant for the deity,
the guilt glazed love lay on Andal's breasts.
thick and heavy as him.
frightened with force
and locked away, she conjured him every night,
her empurumaan, her emperor-man. 

My surging breasts long to leap to the touch of his hand which holds aloft the flaming discus and the conch.

Coax the world-measurer to caress my waist, to encircle the twin globes of my breasts

In one of her poems, Andal says that her voluptuous breasts will swell for the lord alone, and scorns the idea of making love to mortal beings, comparing that with the sacrificial offering made by Brahmins being violated by jackals in the forest, and in another verse she dedicates her swelling breasts to the Lord who carries a conch.

In popular culture
The songs of Naalayira Divya Prabandham are regularly sung in all the Vishnu temples of South India daily and also during festivals. Andal is worshipped as a goddess in the Sri Vaishnava tradition of South India, and enshrined in several Vishnu temples. The verses of Thiruppavai and Nachiyar Tirumoli are sung commonly in all the households and temples during the month of Margali (December - January).

Redention of Varanam Aayiram was included in Ilaiyaraaja's score for Kamal Haasan's movie Hey Ram, with Shrivilliputhur Andal being acknowledged as one of the lyricists for the movie

See also 

 Kanninun Cirutampu
 Tiruviruttam
 Tiruchanda Viruttam

Notes

References

External links
Nachiyar Tirumoli meaning
Short essay on nAcciyAR Tirumoli
Detailed Commentary
Nachiyar Tirumoli Audio
The Poems of Andal Tiruppavai and Nacciyar Tirumoli
Nachchiyar Tirumoli audio 
Varanamayiram by S.P.B
Varanamayiram 6.6

Naalayira Divya Prabandham